Vazhapadi (Valapady, or Valappadi) is a town panchayat in Salem district in the Indian state of Tamil Nadu. It is the headquarters of Vazhapadi taluk, one of the 13 taluks of Salem district.

Geography
Vazhapadi is within Vazhapadi taluk, which is the central part of Salem district. National Highway 79 passes to the south of the town, and the only railroad line in the taluk runs through the town.

Demographics
In 2011 Vazhapadi had a population of 17,559 people living in 4,582 households. 8,843 (50.4%) of the inhabitants were male, while 8,716 (49.6%) were female. 1,679 children in the town, about 9.6% of the population, were at or below the age of 6. The literacy rate in the town was 74.4%. Scheduled Castes and Scheduled Tribes accounted for 26.4% and 0.26% of the population, respectively.

Politics
Former union minister Vazhappady K. Ramamurthy was born in Vazhapadi. He served as Union Minister of Petroleum as part of NDA government under Atal Behari Vajpayee. He was widely known as Valappadiyar.

References

Cities and towns in Salem district